Sunday Beauty Queen is a 2016 Filipino documentary film directed by Baby Ruth Villarama and follows a group of expatriate domestic workers in Hong Kong as they prepare to take part in an annual beauty pageant. It made its world premiere in the Wide Angle documentary competition at the 21st Busan International Film Festival in 2016.

The film is an official entry to the 2016 Metro Manila Film Festival.

Cast
 Rudelyn Acosta
 Cherrie Mae Bretana  
 Mylyn Jacobo 
 Hazel Perdido
 Leo Selomenio
 Bryan Chavez

References

External links

Philippine documentary films
Philippine New Wave
Films set in Hong Kong
2016 documentary films
Filipino-language films